Neolamprologus nigriventris is a species of cichlid endemic to Lake Tanganyika where it is usually found along the lakes southwestern coast in the Democratic Republic of the Congo.    This species can reach a length of  TL.  This species can also be found in the aquarium trade.

References

Büscher, H. H., 1992. Neolamprologus nigriventris n. sp.: ein neuer Tanganjikasee-Cichlide (Cichlidae, Lamprologini). D.A.T.Z. 45(12):778–782.

nigriventris
Taxa named by Heinz Heinrich Büscher
Fish described in 1992
Fish of Lake Tanganyika